Babassu oil or cusi oil is a clear light yellow vegetable oil extracted from the seeds of the babassu palm (Attalea speciosa) which grows in the Amazon region of South America. It is a non-drying oil used in food, cleaners and skin products. This oil has properties similar to coconut oil and is used in much the same context.  It is increasingly being used as a substitute for coconut oil. Babassu oil is about 70% lipids, in the following proportions:

Lauric and myristic acids have melting points relatively close to human body temperature, so babassu oil can be applied to the skin as a solid that melts on contact. This heat transfer can produce a cooling sensation. It is an effective emollient. 

During February 2008, a mixture of babassu oil and coconut oil was used to partially power one engine of a Boeing 747, in a biofuel trial sponsored by Virgin Atlantic.

References

Cooking oils
Energy crops
Vegetable oils